Omni News (styled as OMNI News) is the name of local and national newscasts in various languages on the Omni Television system in Canada.

National
Omni Television produces daily newscasts in Italian, Punjabi, Arabic, Filipino, Cantonese, and Mandarin. This began on September 1, 2017, when OMNI Newscasts returned to the OMNI stations as part of OMNI Regional, a service that provides multilingual shows, affairs shows, and news shows. Prior to this, Omni News programs were cancelled on May 4, 2015.

Previously, on November 7, 2011, Omni launched half-hour national newscasts in Cantonese, Mandarin and Punjabi
 Omni News: Italian Edition daily at noon
 Anchors: Onofrio Di Lernia & Teresa Romano 
 Omni News: Punjabi National Edition - weeknights at 7:00
 Anchor: Dilbar Kang
 Focus Punjabi - weeknights at 7:30
 Anchor: Dilbar Kang
 Omni News: Filipino National Edition - weeknights at 8:00
 Anchor: Marieton Pacheco, Arvin Joaquin, Ron Gagalac, Theresa Barrera & Rhea Santos
 Omni News: Cantonese National Edition - weeknights at 9:00 
 Anchors: Jenny Qin, Brian Hui, Michael Fung & Stephenie Fung
 Focus Cantonese - weeknights at 9:30
 Anchor: Kenneth Li (Toronto program)
 Anchor: Karen So (Vancouver program)
 Omni News: Mandarin National Edition - weeknights at 10:00
 Anchors: Anddy Zhao, Nicole Wang, Nelly Li & Jenny Qin
 Focus Mandarin - weeknights at 10:30pm
 Anchor: Wei Lee (Toronto program)
 Anchor: Bowen Zhang (Vancouver program)
 Omni News: Mandarin National Edition Weekend - weekends at 6:00 pm
 Anchor: Yuli Hu
 Omni News: Filipino National Edition Weekend - weekends at 8:00 pm
 Anchor: Ron Gagalac
 Omni News: Cantonese National Edition Weekend - weekends at 10:00 pm
 Anchor: Tina Tse

Ontario

Omni News in Ontario began as the local newscasts seen on Toronto's CFMT-DT. Before the station was renamed "Omni.1" on September 16, 2002, CFMT aired newscasts in Cantonese, Italian and Portuguese on weeknights. In addition, the station also aired weekend magazine programs Weekend Wide Angle Lens (in Mandarin) and South Asian Newsweek (in English).

The station is news operation was restructured into Omni News in conjunction with the September 16, 2002 launch of CJMT-DT ("Omni.2"). The Cantonese newscast was moved from CFMT to CJMT, and new Mandarin and South Asian weekday newscasts were also launched.

Between 2002 and 2015, the two Omni Television stations aired the following newscasts:

Omni.1
 Omni News: Italian Edition - weeknights at 8:00pm
 Anchor: Vincenzo Somma
 Sports Anchor: Dino Cavalluzzo
 Omni News: Portuguese Edition - weeknights at 5:00
 Anchor: Clara Abreu
 Sports Anchor: Alexandre Franco

OMNI 2
 OMNI News: Cantonese Edition - Monday to Friday at 9:00 PM
 Anchor: Stanley So, Susan Ip, Kenneth Li, Jason Leung
 Omni News: Mandarin Edition - Monday to Friday at 8:00 PM
 Anchor: Wei Lee

Alberta
Omni News in Alberta was launched in September 15, 2008 in conjunction with CJCO-DT in Calgary and CJEO-DT in Edmonton. The two stations produced three nightly television newscasts aimed at the Cantonese, Mandarin, and South Asian communities across the province. While there were news gathering teams in both Edmonton and Calgary, the newscasts were presented from the Citytv/Omni Television studios in Downtown Edmonton.

Omni Alberta ceased production of its local newscasts on September 15, 2011 as part of a reorganization at Rogers Media. National newscasts in Cantonese, Mandarin and Punjabi, as well as Omni News: South Asian Edition produced from Toronto are now seen on Omni Alberta; these newscasts feature one or two stories from Alberta per day. Production of local content at Omni Alberta ended on May 31, 2013.

Omni Alberta's local newscasts which ended May 2013:
 Omni News: Mandarin Edition - weekdays at 5:00p
 Thomas Deng, Mirian Chiu
 Omni News: South Asian Edition - weeknights at 8:00
 Sudha Krishnan, Aadel Halem
 Omni News: Cantonese Edition - weeknights at 9:00
 Kit Koon, Jonathan Lau, Kelly Leung, Brian Wong

British Columbia
CHNM-DT in Vancouver, British Columbia produces the following newscasts:
 Focus Punjabi  - weeknights at 7:30 with Dilbar Kang
 Focus Cantonese  - weeknights at 9:30 with Karen So (蘇嘉欣)
 Focus Mandarin  - weeknights at 10:30 with Bowen Zhang (張博)

CHNM's newscasts were known as Channel M News from June 30, 2003, to September 14, 2008. During those years, the station also had a reciprocal agreement Vancouver's CTV station CIVT-DT, which allowed the two stations to share news resources. The station is newscasts were rebranded Omni News in September 15, 2008, following the approval of its sale to Rogers, and its news sharing agreement with CIVT also ended.

The station also used to produce newscasts in Tagalog. Following the station is acquisition by Rogers, production of those newscasts were handed over to independent production companies.

See also
 CityNews, the news operation of sister station Citytv

References

External links
 OMNI News

Omni Television original programming
1970s Canadian television news shows
1979 Canadian television series debuts
Television shows filmed in Edmonton
Television shows filmed in Toronto
Television shows filmed in Vancouver
1980s Canadian television news shows
1990s Canadian television news shows
2000s Canadian television news shows
2010s Canadian television news shows
2020s Canadian television news shows
Chinese television news shows
Mandarin-language television shows
Italian television news shows
Philippine television news shows